Vegårshei Station is a railway station located in the village of Myra in Vegårshei municipality in Agder county, Norway.  The station is located along the Sørlandet Line and it is served by express trains to Kristiansand and Oslo. The station is owned and operated by Bane NOR.

History
The station was opened on 10 November 1935 when the Sørlandet Line was extended from Neslandsvatn Station to Arendal Station.

References

Railway stations on the Sørlandet Line
Railway stations in Agder
Railway stations opened in 1935
1935 establishments in Norway
Vegårshei